is a Japanese voice actor affiliated with Vozator Voice Production. Nonaka has been excessively famous for his role as Kyo Kusanagi, as well as the two Kyo clones, Kyo-1 and Kyo-2, in The King of Fighters fighting game series. Nonaka is also did the voice of another SNK character, Basara in the Samurai Shodown series.

Nonaka has made several event appearances in Japan, including live Neo Geo DJ Station concerts and promotional appearances for various SNK games. He has also appeared on the previously aired Japanese radio show Game Dra Night, hosted by Kyōko Hikami and Takehito Koyasu (coincidentally, Koyasu is the voice of Kyo's student, Shingo Yabuki, in The King of Fighters series). As Kyo, he also participates as a member of SNK's character image band, Band of Fighters.

Filmography

Anime 
 The King of Fighters: Another Day (2006) – Kyo Kusanagi (ep. 4)

Video Games 
 The King of Fighters '94 – Kyo Kusanagi
 The King of Fighters '95 – Kyo Kusanagi
 Samurai Shodown III – Basara
 The King of Fighters '96 – Kyo Kusanagi
 Samurai Shodown IV – Basara Kubikiri
 The King of Fighters '96 Neo-Geo Collection – Kyo Kusanagi, Himself
 The King of Fighters '97 – Kyo Kusanagi
 The King of Fighters '98 – Kyo Kusanagi
 The King of Fighters: Kyo – Kyo Kusanagi
 The King of Fighters '99 – Kyo Kusanagi, Kyo-1, Kyo-2
 The King of Fighters 2000 – Kyo Kusanagi
 Capcom vs. SNK: Millennium Fight 2000 – Kyo Kusanagi
 Capcom vs. SNK 2 – Kyo Kusanagi
 The King of Fighters 2001 – Kyo Kusanagi
 The King of Fighters EX: Neo Blood – Kyo Kusanagi
 The King of Fighters 2002 – Kyo Kusanagi
 SNK vs. Capcom: SVC Chaos – Kyo Kusanagi
 Samurai Shodown V – Basara Kubikiri
 The King of Fighters EX2: Howling Blood – Kyo Kusanagi
 The King of Fighters 2003 – Kyo Kusanagi
 Samurai Shodown V Special – Basara Kubikiri
 The King of Fighters: Maximum Impact – Kyo Kusanagi
 The King of Fighters Neowave – Kyo Kusanagi
 NeoGeo Battle Coliseum – Kyo Kusanagi
 The King of Fighters XI – Kyo Kusanagi, EX Kyo Kusanagi
 KOF: Maximum Impact 2 – Kyo Kusanagi, Kyo Kusanagi Classic
 The King of Fighters XII – Kyo Kusanagi
 KOF Sky Stage – Kyo Kusanagi
 The King of Fighters XIII – Kyo Kusanagi, NESTS Kyo
 Neo Geo Heroes: Ultimate Shooting – Kyo Kusanagi

CD

Albums 
 Neo Geo Guys Vocal Collection
 SNK Character Sounds Collection Volume 1 ~ Kyo Kusanagi
 Neo Geo DJ Station
 Neo Geo DJ Station Special
 Neo Geo DJ Station Live '98
 Neo Geo DJ Station in Neo Chupi
 Neo Geo DJ Station 2 ~BOF Returns~
 Neo Geo DJ Station Live '99
 Neo Geo DJ Station in Gemodura Night!
 The King of Fighters '96 Drama CD
 The King of Fighters '97 Drama CD (Collision Chapter)
 The King of Fighters '97 Drama CD (Destiny Chapter)
 The King of Fighters '98: The Dream Match Never Ends Drama CD
 The King of Fighters '99 Drama CD
 The King of Fighters '00 Drama CD
 KOF: Mid Summer Struggle

Soundtracks 
 The King of Fighters '96 Arranged Soundtrack (as Kyo Kusanagi)

References

External links 
 
 Masahiro Nonaka at MobyGames
 
 Masahiro Nonaka at Arcade-History

1968 births
Living people
Male voice actors from Hiroshima
Japanese male singers
Japanese male video game actors
Japanese male voice actors
Musicians from Hiroshima
20th-century Japanese male actors
21st-century Japanese male actors